Seven Devils Moonshine is a five-disc box set by the American heavy metal band Virgin Steele, comprising three new albums and tow reissues. It was released in November 2018 by SPV/Steamhammer.

Track listing
CDs 1 to 3 are new albums, while CDs 4 and 5 are reissues of Hymns to Victory and The Book of Burning respectively, along with bonus tracks.

Ghost Harvest Vintage I: Black Wine For Mourning

Ghost Harvest Vintage II: Red Wine For Warning

Gothic Voodoo Anthems

Hymns To Victory

The Book Of Burning

Personnel
 David DeFeis - all vocals, keyboards, percussions, guitars, orchestration, effects, producer
 Edward Pursino - acoustic and electric guitars
 Joshua Block - guitars, bass, engineer

References

Virgin Steele albums
Noise Records albums